G. V. Prasad is an Indian business executive, and co-chairman and managing director of Dr. Reddy's Laboratories. He studied chemical engineering at the Alagappa College of Technology. After completing five semesters, he went on to the Illinois Institute of Technology in Chicago to complete the three remaining semesters. Prasad followed up the engineering degree with a one-year MBA at Purdue University. He won the 'Outstanding Senior Student' Award from the American Institute of Chemists, Chicago chapter in 1982. He earned his master's degree in industrial administration from Purdue University a year later.

Prasad was in 1985 with Benzex Labs, a pharmaceutical enterprise that he co-founded. Benzex was later acquired by Dr. Reddys and he returned to the construction business. In 1990, he was the CEO and MD of Cheminor Drugs Ltd. In 2001, Cheminor Drugs merged with Dr. Reddy's Laboratories and Prasad took over as the vice-chairman and CEO of the merged entity.

Early life
Prasad, the second child of Syamala and Harishchandra Reddy, did his initial schooling at the Vidyaranya High School in Hyderabad, Andhra Pradesh, India. He later moved to his hometown, Nellore, where he finished his schooling at VR High School.

Personal life
Prasad is married to Anuradha, the daughter of Kallam Anji Reddy, who is the founder of Dr. Reddy's Labs. Anuradha is the managing trustee of Dr. Reddy's Foundation as well as the founder-director of Saptaparni, an organization promoting the traditions and culture of India.

Early career

After completing his master's degree, Prasad returned to India and joined his father's construction business, immersing himself in various projects in Karnataka. In 1985, he co-founded Benzex Labs, an API manufacturing company, which was later acquired by Dr Reddy's. He briefly returned to the construction business before reappearing on the pharma landscape in 1990 as managing director of Cheminor Drugs Ltd. Fueled by a spirit of entrepreneurship, Prasad transformed Cheminor into a world class API and generics manufacturer, largely through his focus on professionalism, good governance and transparency.

In 2001, Cheminor Drugs merged with Dr. Reddy's Laboratories and Prasad took over as the vice-chairman and CEO of the merged entity. He is widely credited as the architect of Dr. Reddy's successful global generics strategy. He envisioned newer business platforms like the Custom Pharmaceutical business and Specialty pharmaceuticals and is dedicated to building the innovation side of the business.

Professional affiliations
AP State Committee, WWF-India
Member of the advisory board, Acumen Fund
Member of the board, Cyient Ltd.
Member of the board, Diana Hotels, India
Member of the board, Ocimum Bio Solutions
Member, American Chemical Society
Member, American Institute of Chemical Engineers
Chairman of the CII National Committee on Environment and the Intellectual Property Committee (2006–2007)

References

External links
 

Living people
Indian chief executives
People from Nellore
Telugu people
Krannert School of Management alumni
Engineers from Andhra Pradesh
Indian biotechnologists
Illinois Institute of Technology alumni
Indian businesspeople in the pharmaceutical industry
Businesspeople from Hyderabad, India
Year of birth missing (living people)